Finnish Cultural Foundation is a private nonprofit foundation dedicated to the promotion of culture and science in Finland. The foundation's assets are about 1.1 billion euros, which makes it one of the largest private foundations in Europe. Annual grants were more than 31 million euros in 2013.

Finnish Cultural Foundation consists of the main fund and 17 regional funds. It was founded in 1939 to counterbalance Finnish cultural life as the Swedish-speaking Finns received significantly more funding because of their own foundation Svenska kulturfonden.

External links 
Finnish Cultural Foundation Official Homepage (English and Finnish)

Foundations based in Finland
Finnish culture
Science and technology in Finland